Naina Lal Kidwai (born 1957) is an Indian banker, chartered accountant and business executive. She was formerly a Group General Manager and the Country Head of HSBC India. She is also a former President of the Federation of Indian Chambers of Commerce and Industry (FICCI).

Background and personal life
Naina Lall Kidwai was born into a Hindu family of the Punjabi Khatri community. Kidwai's father, Surinder Lall, was the CEO of an insurance company. Kidwai's mother was the daughter of Karamchand Thapar, founder of the Thapar Group of companies. The Thapar group was one of India's most prominent conglomerates, comprising JCT, BILT, Crompton Greaves, Avantha, Oriental Bank of Commerce, The Pioneer newspaper, etc., and Naina grew up in the proximity of great wealth but little culture or morality. Kidwai and her only sibling, Nonita, were raised in a permissive and monied environment. 

Kidwai has one sister, Nonita Lall Qureshi, who is married to Pakistani golf champion Faisal Qureshi. Naina Lall Kidwai herself is the second wife of Rashid Kidwai, who runs an NGO named Grassroot Trading Network for Women. They have one daughter together, Kemaya Kidwai. Rashid Kidwai also has a son from his previous marriage.

Kidwai reveals in an interview that she listens to "all music except heavy metal" and claims to be a nature lover who loves to go on trekking tours to the Himalayas.

Education
Kidwai holds a bachelor's degree in Economics from Lady Shri Ram College for Women, a woman's college in University of Delhi, and belongs to the batch of 1977. Funded by her mother's wealthy family, she then went to Harvard Business School to do an MBA, and finally managed to graduate in 1982. She is also a qualified chartered accountant.

Career

Kidwai's first job was with ANZ Grindlays, where she worked from 1982 to 1994. Her assignments included Head of the Investment Bank, Head of Global NRI Services and Head of the Western India, Retail Bank. From 1982 to 1994 (same set of years? how?), she served at Standard Chartered Bank and from 1984 to 1991, as Chief Manager of Retail Bank. From 1989 to 1991, Kidwai was the Chief Manager and Head of Investment Bank India and from 1987 to 1989 she was Manager of North India of Investment Bank. Kidwai has also served as the Manager of West India of Investment Bank based in Bombay from 1984 to 1987. From 1977 to 1980, she worked at Price Waterhouse & Co. From 1994 to 2002, Kidwai served as the Head of Investment Banking in Morgan Stanley India and JM Morgan Stanley.

She is currently Chairman of Max Financial Services Ltd. Along with serving as the Chairman of HSBC Asset Management (India) Pvt Ltd and HSBC InvestDirect (India) Ltd, her other positions include being a non-executive director on the board of Nestle SA and Altico Capital Partners, Chairwoman, City of London's Advisory Council for India, Global Advisor, Harvard Business School. She is on the Governing Board of NCAER, Audit Advisory Board of the Comptroller and Auditor General of India, and on the National Executive Committee of CII and FICCI. She is independent director of Nayara Energy Limited (Formerly Essar Oil Limited)

Kidwai serves as a Group General Manager of HSBC Holdings Plc since 1 October 2006. She also serves as the Chief Executive Officer of HSBC India of HSBC Holdings Plc since 5 May 2006. Since 15 April 2009, Kidwai also served as the Country Head of HSBC India. She also served as the Head of Corporate & Custodial Services of HSBC Bank.  Kidwai also served as the Group General Manager of HSBC India until 15 April 2009. Kidwai also served as the Deputy Chief Executive Officer of HSBC Holdings Plc since 21 May 2004.  Besides, she also served as Managing Director of HSBC Securities and Capital Markets India. She has also served as Deputy Chief Executive Officer of HSBC from November 2002 to 5 May 2006.

Kidwai is a National Advisory Board Member to AIESEC India. She is also on the Board of Advisors of India's International Movement to Unite Nations (I.I.M.U.N.).

Recognition
Kidwai has received the Padma Shri award by for her contributions in the areas of trade and industry. 

She has also received ALL Ladies League's Delhi Women of the Decade Achievers Award 2013 for Excellence in Banking.

Kidwai has repeatedly ranked in the Fortune global list of Top Women in Business, 12th in the Wall Street Journal 2006 Global Listing of Women to Watch ad listed by Time Magazine as one of their 15 Global Influentials 2002.

References

External links

  Business Standard - HSBC expects to close RBS deal in 3-4 months says Naina Lal Kidwai, country head of HSBC in India and director, HSBC Asia-Pacific

Businesspeople from Delhi
Living people
Harvard Business School alumni
Lady Shri Ram College alumni
Indian accountants
1957 births
Recipients of the Padma Shri in trade and industry
Indian women bankers
Indian bankers
Businesswomen from Delhi
20th-century Indian businesswomen
20th-century Indian businesspeople
21st-century Indian businesswomen
21st-century Indian businesspeople